Wingsuit flying (or wingsuiting) is the sport of skydiving using a webbing-sleeved jumpsuit called a wingsuit to add webbed area to the diver's body and generate increased lift, which allows extended air time by gliding flight rather than just free falling. The modern wingsuit, first developed in the late 1990s, uses a pair of fabric membranes stretched flat between the arms and flanks/thighs to imitate an airfoil, and often also between the legs to function as a tail and allow some aerial steering.

Like all skydiving disciplines, a wingsuit flight almost always ends by deploying a parachute, and so a wingsuit can be flown from any point that provides sufficient altitude for flight and parachute deployment – a drop aircraft, or BASE-jump exit point such as a tall cliff or mountain top. The wingsuit flier wears parachuting equipment specially designed for skydiving or BASE jumping. While the parachute flight is normal, the canopy pilot must unzip arm wings (after deployment) to be able to reach the steering parachute toggles and control the descent path.

Wingsuits are sometimes referred to as "birdman suits" (after the brand name of the makers of the first commercial wingsuit), "squirrel suits" (from their resemblance to flying squirrels' wing membrane), and "bat suits" (due to their resemblance to bat wings or perhaps the comicbook superhero's battle costume).

History

An early attempt at wingsuit flying was made on 4 February 1912 by a 33-year-old tailor, Franz Reichelt, who jumped from the Eiffel Tower to test his invention of a combination of parachute and wing, which was similar to modern wingsuits. He misled the guards by saying that the experiment was going to be conducted with a dummy. He hesitated quite a long time before he jumped, and died when he hit the ground head first, opening a measurable hole in the frozen ground.

A wingsuit was first used in the US in 1930 by a 19-year-old American, Rex G Finney of Los Angeles, California. The goal was to increase horizontal movement and maneuverability during a parachute jump. These early wingsuits used materials such as canvas, wood, silk, steel, and whalebone. They were not very reliable, although some "birdmen", such as Clem Sohn and Leo Valentin, claimed to have glided for miles.

Batwings, a precursor to wingsuits, were showcased in the 1969 film, The Gypsy Moths, starring Burt Lancaster and Gene Hackman.

In the mid-1990s, the modern wingsuit was developed by Patrick de Gayardon of France, adapted from the model used by John Carta. In 1997, the Bulgarian Sammy Popov designed and built a wingsuit that had a larger wing between the legs and longer wings on the arms. He tested his prototype in a vertical wind tunnel in Las Vegas at Flyaway Las Vegas. Popov's wingsuit first flew in October 1998, but never went into commercial production. In 1998, Chuck "Da Kine" Priest' built a version that incorporated hard ribs inside the wing airfoils. Although these more rigid wings were better able to keep their shape in flight, this made the wingsuit heavier and more difficult to fly. Raggs' design also never went into commercial production.  Flying together for the first time, Popov and Raggs showcased their designs side by side at the World Free-fall Convention at Quincy, Illinois, in August 1999. Both designs performed well. At the same event, jumpers performed formation wingsuit skydives with de Gayardon's, Popov's, and Raggs' suits.

Commercial era
In 1999, Jari Kuosma of Finland and Robert Pečnik of Croatia teamed up to create a wingsuit that was safe and accessible to all skydivers. Kuosma established Bird-Man International Ltd. the same year. BirdMan's "Classic", designed by Pečnik, was the first wingsuit offered to the general skydiving public. BirdMan was the first manufacturer to develop an instructor program. Created by Kuosma, the instructor program's aim was to remove the stigma that wingsuits were dangerous and to provide wingsuit beginners (generally, skydivers with a minimum of 200 jumps) with a way to safely enjoy what was once considered the most dangerous feat in the skydiving world. With the help of Birdman instructors Scott Campos, Chuck Blue, and Kim Griffin, a standardized program of instruction was developed that prepared instructors. Wingsuit manufacturers Squirrel Wingsuits, TonySuits Wingsuits, Phoenix-Fly, Fly Your Body, and Nitro Rigging have also instituted coach training programs.

Technique

Launch
A wingsuit pilot enters free fall wearing both a wingsuit and parachute equipment. The details of a wingsuit launch depend on whether it is a skydive from an aircraft, or a BASE jump from a fixed object.

Exiting an aircraft in a wingsuit requires skills that differ depending on the location and size of the door. These techniques include the orientation relative to the aircraft and the airflow while exiting. It is also important that wingsuit pilots spread their legs and arms at the proper time to avoid hitting the tail or becoming unstable. The wingsuit immediately starts to fly upon exiting the aircraft in the relative wind generated by the forward speed of the aircraft.

Exiting from a BASE jumping site, such as a cliff, requires a different technique. In these situations, a vertical drop using the forces of gravity generates the airspeed that wingsuits need to generate lift. This is also the case when exiting from a helicopter, a paraglider, or a hot air balloon. Unlike when exiting an airplane, it takes time to build up airspeed to inflate the wingsuit and provide aerodynamic control. So exiting the cliff in a proper orientation is critical.

Glide
A wingsuit modifies the body area exposed to wind to increase the desired amount of lift and drag generated by the body. With training, wingsuit pilots can achieve sustained glide ratio of 3:1 or more. This means that for every meter dropped, three meters are gained moving forward. By adjusting body configuration, fliers can alter both their forward speed and fall rate. The pilot manipulates these flight characteristics by changing the shape of the torso, de-arching and rolling the shoulders and moving hips and knees, and by changing the angle of attack in which the wingsuit flies in the relative wind, and by the amount of tension applied to the fabric wings of the suit. The absence of a vertical stabilizing surface results in little damping around the yaw axis, so poor flying technique can result in a spin that requires active effort on the part of the skydiver to stop.

A typical skydiver's terminal velocity in belly to earth orientation ranges from 180 to 225 km/h (110 to 140 mph). A wingsuit can reduce these speeds dramatically. A vertical instantaneous velocity of 40 km/h (25 mph) has been recorded. However the speed at which the body advances forward through the air is still much higher (up to 100 km/h [62 mph]).

The glide ratios of older wingsuits made in the 1990s through the early 2010s were closer to 2:1.It was possible for expert flyers to achieve a 3:1 ratio but this was very difficult. However, advancements in modern wingsuits allow flyers to achieve a 3:1 ratio much more easily, allowing for higher speeds.

Flare 

Wingsuits can perform a flare in which airspeed is exchanged for additional lift. By first diving to build up speed, modern wingsuits can flare enough to gain altitude, but only for a short time.

Deployment 

At a planned altitude above the ground in which a skydiver or BASE jumper typically deploys the parachute, wingsuit fliers will also deploy their parachutes. Before deployment, pilots adjust their flight configuration by flaring to reduce their air speed. The pilot then reaches back and throws a pilot chute to initiate the parachute deployment sequence. The parachute is flown to a controlled landing at the desired landing spot using typical skydiving or BASE jumping techniques.

Record-keeping 
Wingsuit pilots often use tools including portable GPS receivers to record their flight path. This data can be analyzed later to evaluate flight performance in terms of fall rate, speed, and glide ratio. When jumping for the first time at a new location, BASE jumpers will often evaluate terrain using maps and laser range finders. By comparing a known terrain profile with previously recorded flight data, jumpers can objectively evaluate whether a particular jump is possible.
BASE jumpers also use landmarks, along with recorded video of their flight, to determine their performance relative to previous flights and the flights of other BASE jumpers at the same site.

Suit design 

Modern wingsuits use a combination of materials in order to create an airfoil shape. The main surface is typically made from ripstop nylon, with various materials used to reinforce the leading edge, and reduce drag.
 The tri-wing wingsuit has three individual ram-air wings attached under the arms and between the legs.
 The mono-wing wingsuit design incorporates the whole suit into one large wing.

Beginner wingsuits have less surface area and lower internal pressure. This makes them easier to control and less likely to go unstable in flight. Less fabric material makes it easier to deploy the pilot chute at the end of the flight. With experience, pilots can choose to upgrade to more advanced suits that have more surface area and increased glide performance.

The air foil shape is formed by pressure inside the wing and the construction of the suit. Internal ribs help form the shape. Having a smooth leading edge is especially important as it is the source of most lift and most drag. Reducing inlet drag while maintaining high internal suit pressure is also important in modern wingsuit design. The number of air inlets and their positions vary on different suit designs. Suits which are focused on freestyle flight often have inlets on the back surface of the suit to maintain internal pressure when pilots are "back flying" in a face up orientation.

A 2010 redesign tested in a wind tunnel by the 8th Conference of the International Sports Engineering Association (ISEA) found that adding material to the wingsuit between the head/helmet area and connecting it to the wrist, thus increasing upper wings' size, would "...lower lift-to-drag ratio in most testing scenarios. The decrease in lift-to-drag ratio was due to the combination of an increased lift and a higher increased drag." Other innovations in the late 2000s and early 2010's helped increase the glide ratio further.

Wingsuit BASE

As compared to skydiving from an airplane, BASE jumping involves jumping from a "fixed object" such as a cliff. BASE jumping in its modern form has existed since at least 1978, but it was not until 1997 that Patrick de Gayardon made some of the first-ever wingsuit BASE jumps combining the two disciplines. Compared to normal BASE jumping, wingsuit BASE jumping allows pilots to fly far away from the cliffs they jumped from, and drastically increase their freefall time before deploying a parachute. Since 2003, many BASE jumpers have started using wingsuits, giving birth to wingsuit BASE.

A wingsuit BASE jump begins by jumping from a cliff. Within seconds, air inflates the suit into a semi-rigid airfoil shape. By holding a proper body position, the wingsuit flier is able to glide forward at a ratio of 3:1, meaning that they are moving forward three feet for every foot of descent (or 3 meters for every meter of descent).

As suit technology and pilot skill have improved, wingsuit BASE jumpers have learned to control their flight so that they can fly just meters away from terrain. “Proximity flying” is the practice of flying a wingsuit close to the faces and ridges of mountains. Flying near terrain gives a greater sense of speed due to having a close visual reference. Loic Jean-Albert of France is one of the first proximity flyers, and his pioneering flying brought many BASE jumpers into the sport. In November 2012, Alexander Polli became the first wingsuit BASE jumper to successfully strike a wingsuit target. Alexander Polli died August 22, 2016 in a wingsuit accident, after crashing into a tree.

Wingsuit BASE jumping carries additional risk beyond a wingsuit skydive. Jumping from a fixed object means starting with low airspeed which requires different flying positions and skills. During the flight, hazards exist such as trees, rocks and the ground which must be avoided. While skydivers typically carry two parachutes, a main and a reserve, wingsuit BASE jumpers typically only carry one BASE-specific parachute.

Wingsuit BASE jumping is an unregulated sport. But to perform the activity safely requires jumpers to be an experienced skydiver, wingsuit pilot, and BASE jumper. It takes hundreds of practice jumps to achieve skill in each of these disciplines before considering wingsuit BASE.

Further technical developments

Jet-powered wingsuits 
As of 2010, there have been experimental powered wingsuits, often using small jet engines strapped to the feet or a wingpack setup to allow for even greater horizontal speeds and even vertical ascent.

On 25 October 2009, in Lahti, Finland, Visa Parviainen jumped from a hot air balloon in a wingsuit with two small turbojet engines attached to his feet. The engines provided approximately 160 N (16 kgf, 35 lbf) of thrust each and ran on JET A-1 fuel. Parviainen achieved approximately 30 seconds of horizontal flight with no noticeable loss of altitude. Parviainen continued jumping from hot air balloons and helicopters, including one for the  Stunt Junkies program on Discovery Channel.

Christian Stadler from Germany invented the "VegaV3 wingsuit system" that uses an electronic adjustable hydrogen peroxide rocket. The rocket provides 1000 Newtons (100 kgf) of thrust and produces no flames or poisonous fumes. His first successful powered wingsuit jump was in 2007, when he reached horizontal speeds of over 255 km/h (160 mph).

Electric wingsuit 
In November, 2020, professional base jumper Peter Salzmann completed the first electric wingsuit flight, using a wingsuit developed by BMW's BMW i division.

Wingpack 
Another variation on which studies are being focused is the wingpack, which consists of a strap-on rigid wing made of carbon fibre.

Training
Flying a wingsuit can add considerable complexity to a skydive. So, according to the Skydivers' Information Manual, the United States Parachute Association requires that any jumper have a minimum of 200 freefall skydives before completing a wingsuit first jump course and making a wingsuit jump. Requirements in other nations are similar. Wingsuit manufacturers offer training courses and certify instructors, and also impose the minimum jump numbers required before purchasing a wingsuit. Wingsuit pilots start on smaller wingsuits with less surface area. With practice, pilots can learn to fly larger suits with more surface area, which allow for increased glide and airtime. Within the sport of wingsuit flying, there are many sub-disciplines that participants may pursue, including: acrobatic flying, performance flying, and wingsuit BASE jumping.

Records

Wingsuit formation records 
Fédération Aéronautique Internationale (FAI), the world governing airsports body, established judging criteria for official world record wingsuit formations in February 2015. The rules are available on the FAI website.

Prior to this, the largest wingsuit formation recognized as meeting the criteria for a national record consisted of 68 wingsuit pilots, which set a U.S. national record at Lake Elsinore, California, on 12 November 2009. The largest global record was a diamond formation involving 100 wingsuit pilots at Perris, California, on 22 September 2012. These records have since been retired as they do not meet the current rules.

Two World Records have been set since the rules update. A 42-person formation over Moorsele, Belgium, set an FAI record on 18 June 2015. This was broken on 17 October 2015, when 61 wingsuit pilots set the current FAI world record over Perris Valley Airport near Perris, California.

The current U.S. national record includes 43 wingsuit pilots. It was set on 5 October 2018 in Rosharon, Texas at Skydive Spaceland-Houston.

Wingsuit BASE jump records

Highest altitude

Longest
Potter jumped from the Eiger mountain and spent 3 minutes and 20 seconds in flight, descending  of altitude.

Biggest

Wingsuit flight records

Fastest

Greatest average horizontal speed
The current world record for greatest average horizontal speed within the performance competition rules, i.e. within  of vertical distance, was set by Travis Mickle (USA) with a speed of 325.4 km/hr (202.19 mph) 6 November 2017. American Ellen Brennan is considered the fastest flying woman in the world.

Longest time
On 20 and 21 April 2012, Colombian skydiver Jhonathan Florez set Guinness World Records in wingsuit flying. The jumps took place in La Guajira in Colombia. The longest (duration) wingsuit flight was 9 minutes, 6 seconds

The current world record for longest time in flight within the performance competition rules, i.e. within  of vertical distance, was set on 28 Aug 2018 by Chris Geiler (USA) with a time of 100.2 sec (1.67 min)

Highest altitude

Farthest
, the Guinness World Record for "greatest absolute distance flown in a wing suit" is 32.094 km (19.94 mi) set by Kyle Lobpries (USA) in Davis, CA on 30 May 2016.

The current world record for longest horizontal distance covered within the performance competition rules, i.e. within  of vertical distance, was set on 27 May 2017 by U.S. wingsuit pilot Alexey Galda with a distance of 5.137 km (3.19 mi)

Landing
On 23 May 2012, British stuntman Gary Connery safely landed a wingsuit without deploying his parachute, landing on a crushable "runway" (landing zone) built with thousands of cardboard boxes.

Safety

Despite training and regulation, wingsuit BASE jumping remains a dangerous pastime, and fatalities occur regularly. A 2012 University of Colorado study found that in wingsuit BASE jumping, there was approximately one severe injury for every 500 jumps undertaken.

A detailed study on wingsuit deaths completed primarily by the University of Colorado found that out of 180 studied fatalities, 97% launched from cliffs and another 1% from buildings. The vast-majority of these deaths were related to the use of the wingsuit, not to do with external sources. This makes aircraft descending a much less-deadly form of wingsuit flying, though deemed less extreme by fans of the sport.

Matt Gerdes, wingsuit tester at the Squirrel wingsuit company claims that wingsuit fatalities are on the rise because the experience of becoming a wingsuit pilot is becoming less personal as many for-profit BASE jumping instructors are allowing some students to skip steps and start testing out wingsuits after fewer and fewer regular parachute jumps. With little oversight from the government, "...instruction in some courses turns out poorly-prepared jumpers who unwittingly skip steps on their way to flying high-performance wingsuits."

Some concerns regarding the nature of wingsuit flying exist due to injuries and death. The French government banned wingsuit flying multiple times following the deaths of French pilots.

See also
 Point Break (2015)

Notes

References

Works cited

Further reading

External links

 
 

Air sports
Gliding
Outdoor recreation
Parachuting
20th-century inventions
Artificial wings